Derick Amadi (born 10 March 1984) is a Nigerian professional footballer who plays for Dolphins FC.

Career
Amadi was named the 1997 Pepsi Football Academy of Nigeria's Most Valuable Player. On 13 March 2006, he moved to Sharks F.C. from the German-based club SC Freiburg. He moved later to Enugu Rangers before leaving the Enugu-based team  in 2008 and joining Heartland F.C.

In February 2011, while playing for Dolphins FC, Amadi was voted and named in the Team of the Week" by the Nigerian Premier League. He played for them going into the 2012–13 seasons.

External links

References

Living people
1984 births
Nigerian footballers
Association football forwards
Pepsi Football Academy players
SC Freiburg players
Rangers International F.C. players
Heartland F.C. players
Sharks F.C. players
Expatriate footballers in Germany